The presidential transition of Rodrigo Duterte started when then-Davao City mayor Rodrigo Duterte won the Philippine presidential election on May 9, 2016. Duterte topped the official count by the Congress of the Philippines on May 27, 2016, with 16,601,997 votes, 6.6 million more than his closest rival. The joint bicameral Congress proclaimed Duterte as the President-elect and Leni Robredo as the Vice President-elect on May 30, 2016.

At the time the presidential transition team was organized, Duterte was leading by a significant margin at the unofficial count by the Commission on Elections (COMELEC) and the Parish Pastoral Council for Responsible Voting (PPCRV).

The transition lasted until the day of the President-elect's inauguration on June 30, 2016.

Transition

Duterte's transition committee
On May 10, 2016, the camp of presidential candidate Rodrigo Duterte announced that a transition committee had been created to handle the presidential transition of Duterte to the day of his formal inauguration as president. The committee would be composed of an overall transition committee and three sub-committees, namely a selection committee, a policy group committee and an inauguration committee. The transition team was finalized the next day and held their first meeting at the Marco Polo Hotel in Davao City.

On May 13, 2016, a transition team divided into six clusters was announced as commencing the process of selecting potential cabinet members. Duterte's spokesman, Peter Laviña, said that the division would hasten the process of receiving nominations of and suggestions for potential members of the Cabinet as well as sub-Cabinet positions and heads for the various agencies. Laviña stated that the criteria for selection include shared vision, integrity, competence, and ability and willingness to sacrifice. Christopher Go, another member of the transition team, quoted Duterte that the criteria for selection for the heads of the Armed Forces of the Philippines and the Philippine National Police will be based on merits, on seniority, and on loyalty to the government and the country.

More women are being planned for Duterte's cabinet. Duterte had appointed numerous women to leadership posts when he was mayor of Davao City.

Aquino's presidential committee
On May 12, 2016, the administration of President Benigno Aquino III has also created their own committee for the presidential transition of Rodrigo Duterte. The Presidential Transition Committee (PTC) is set to coordinate with Duterte's transition team and will be submitting reports to them. The Agency Focal Person of the transition body is Executive Secretary Paquito Ochoa, Jr.

Cabinet

Undersecretaries

Other officials

Declined

Duterte said in a press conference on May 31, that he will not appoint a Cabinet position for Vice President Leni Robredo, saying that Robredo is from the "opposite side", and the appointment of Robredo as one of the members of his cabinet could further hurt his friendship and alliance with Senator Bongbong Marcos, Robredo's closest rival in the vice presidential election.

International reactions
 : On May 20, the Australian Department of Foreign Affairs and Trade released a congratulatory message saying that Australia is looking forward to work with the new Philippine government in developing the Australia–Philippines bilateral relations and "address shared regional and global challenges." The statement also said that the two countries "share similar values and interests, including a commitment to democracy, and a determination to work for peace, security and economic growth." The statement came after Duterte's controversial remarks on a rape incident on an Australian missionary during the 1989 Davao hostage crisis, which was condemned by Australian Ambassador to the Philippines Amanda Gorely and prompted Duterte to urge Australia to cut ties with the Philippines if he was elected president.
 : Prime Minister Justin Trudeau called Duterte and congratulated the President-elect on his victory in the elections. Duterte apologized to Trudeau over the beheading of John Ridsdel, a Canadian taken hostage by the Abu Sayyaf Group in April.
 : Chinese Ministry of Foreign Affairs spokesperson Hong Lei congratulated Duterte on behalf of the Chinese government during a press briefing and expressed hope for a development in China–Philippines relations under the new administration. When asked about the two countries' relations amid the territorial disputes in the South China Sea, Hong said that China "stands ready to work alongside the new Philippine government to properly deal with relevant disputes through friendly dialogue and bring bilateral ties back to the track of sound development." On May 30, President Xi Jinping sent a congratulatory message to Duterte expressing hope that China and the Philippines can "get back on the track of healthy development" and continue to enjoy their "historical friendship".
 : European Council President Donald Tusk and European Commission President Jean-Claude Juncker wrote a congratulatory letter to Duterte saying that the Philippines and the European Union share a "close partnership grounded in a long history and in strong mutual interests" and expressed hope that the Philippines would support the European Union's interest in joining the East Asia Summit. 
 : Chancellor Angela Merkel sent a congratulatory letter to Duterte on June 1, expressing willingness to continue deepening Germany–Philippines relations, saying that the two countries' relations are characterized by friendship and trust "that includes our shared conviction that democracy, human rights, the rule of law and inclusive economic growth are indispensable for sustainable development." Merkel also expressed hope for the resolution of the Bangsamoro peace process.
 : Israeli Ambassador to the Philippines Effie Ben Matityau congratulated Duterte during a speech on May 12. Matityau said that Israel is looking forward to developing their "special friendship" with the Philippines through the Duterte administration, saying that the Israel–Philippines relations is special because it started before the two countries became fully independent.
 : Prime Minister Shinzo Abe through his special advisor Katsuyuki Kawai congratulated president-elect Duterte for his victory in the 2016 elections. Japan also expressed their support to the Philippine government's decision to elevate the case on the territorial dispute in the South China Sea in the International Arbital Tribunal.
 : President Tony Tan and Prime Minister Lee Hsien Loong both wrote letters to Duterte congratulating him on his victory. In his letter, President Tan expressed confidence that Duterte would lead the economy of the Philippines into "greater heights" and extended an invitation for the president-elect to visit Singapore after he is inaugurated. Prime Minister Lee wrote to wish Duterte "good health and success in his position" and expressed interest in working with him "for the benefit of their countries, peoples and ASEAN."
 : South Korean Ambassador to the Philippines Kim Jae-shin paid a visit to Duterte in Davao City on June 2 to congratulate him and discuss the expansion of Philippines–South Korea relations, saying: "We hope under his leadership, the Philippines will continue to develop further and further. We want to expand our bilateral relations. Both countries will cooperate in a mutually beneficial way." Kim also said that the South Korean government vowed to assist Duterte in achieving his anti-crime policies by donating patrol cars and motorcycles worth $6.6 million.
 : President Barack Obama was the first foreign head of state or government to greet Duterte, calling him over the phone to congratulate him over his victory in the election. Duterte and Obama reaffirmed the close relationship between the Philippines and United States.

In a press conference held in his hometown, Davao City, on May 31, 2016, President-elect Duterte answered a question regarding the slay of journalists by stating that it has been corrupt journalists who have become targets for assassination. He further stated that journalists are not exempted by assassins simply by virtue of their being journalists. He also said there was no excuse for journalists who engaged in corrupt activities and took bribes.

Duterte's statements became controversial after media groups expressed outrage towards the President-elect the following day. Killings of journalists in the past were cited, particularly those of 58 journalists killed by a political clan in Maguindanao in 2009, along with those of a recorded 176 journalists murdered since the corruption-plagued Martial Law era under Ferdinand Marcos, the total of which has marked the Philippines as one of the most dangerous countries in the world for journalists to work in. Furthermore, Duterte's controversial statement was made three days after another journalist was shot dead by two unidentified men in Manila.

As a result of the controversy and a consequent suggestion by an international journalists group to the Philippine media to boycott Duterte's press conferences, Duterte in turn stated that he will no longer grant interviews to journalists from the privately owned media organizations until the end of his term in 2022 and instead air announcements and press releases through Government-owned People's Television Network (PTV Channel 4), expressly to avoid queries that could elicit soundbite statements from him that would result in further controversy, with Duterte adding that he does not need the private media. However, this was only lasted for 2 months, after the now-President Duterte hold a press conference with journalists at the Malacañang Palace on August 1, 2016.

See also
 Rodrigo Duterte presidential campaign, 2016
 Inauguration of Rodrigo Duterte
 Presidency of Rodrigo Duterte

Notes

References

Transition
2016 Philippine presidential election
Philippine presidential transitions